The National Council of Women of the United States (NCW/US) is the oldest  nonsectarian organization of women in America. Officially founded in 1888, the NCW/US is an accredited non-governmental organization (NGO) with the Department of Public Information (UN/DPI) and in Consultative Status with the Economic and Social Council of the United Nations (ECOSOC).

Establishment

During the preparations of 1887–1888 for the meeting of the International Council of Women, May Wright Sewall, an active member of the Committee of Arrangements, conceived the idea of finalizing the results of that gathering of women into permanent organizations dedicated to the uplifting of humanity. From her carefully elaborated thought arose the permanent International Council of Women and the National Council of Women of the United States, both organized, and their central boards of officers elected, March 31, 1888, in Washington, D.C. The first official officers of the National Council of Women of the United States were Frances Willard, President; Susan B. Anthony, Vice President; Mary F. Eastman, Recording Secretary; M. Louise Thomas, Treasurer; May Wright Sewall, Corresponding Secretary. They adopted and presented the following preamble:

"We, women of the United States of America, believe that the best good of humanity will be advanced by efforts toward greater unity of sympathy and purpose, and that a voluntary association of individuals so united will best serve the highest good of the family, the community, the state, do hereby freely band ourselves together into a federation of all races, creeds, and traditions, to further the application of the Golden Rule to society, custom, and law."

All national organisations of women, interested in the advancement of women's work in education, philanthropy, reform, and social culture, were welcome to join. When an organization entered the council, its president became an acting vice-president in the council, and it also had the right to appoint one person to represent it on the executive board of the council. This board included the general officers of the council, together with the presidents of all organisations belonging to it, and one delegate besides its president from every organisation. This board also constituted a committee of arrangements for the first triennial meeting of the council.

The constitution of the NCW/US called for triennial meetings of this organization to be held at Washington, D.C. At the close of the various business meetings of 1888 connected with the International Council of Women, it was agreed that the NCW/US would hold the first of the triennial meeting, provided for by its constitution, in February 1891 at the Albaugh's Opera House. The central board of officers was responsible for arranging this meeting.

Present day 
Today, the National Council of Women of the United States works to address the diverse concerns of women in pursuit of social, economic, and political equality while serving as a united voice and forum to promote progressive ideas and influence policy decisions that impact human rights. They represent all races, creeds and traditions.

The National Council of Women of the United States, along with its member organizations and individual members, continues today to uphold their mission statement: to further the application of the Golden Rule to society, customs, and law.

During the annual United Nations Commission on the Status of Women, the Council serves as host to hundreds of women from all over the world, introducing them to the United Nations as an organized body of 192 nations with many Commissions, Conventions and Treaties that impact women and children here and across the globe. Monitoring the United Nations and reporting on current issues and activities, they also develop, implement and present public interest seminars and workshops.

Member organizations 
The National Council of Women is an affiliate of the International Council of Women.  The following organizations are affiliates of the National Council of Women/US: NANBPWC, Delta Sigma Theta sorority, Nation to Nation Networking, Knowledge iTrust, Pan-Pacific and Southeast Asia Women's Association, Sigma Gamma Rho sorority, Sister To Sister International,  Soroptimist International, Ukrainian National Women's League of America, National Council of Women of New Zealand, International Health Awareness Network, National Council of Ghanaian Associations, United Nations Association of America (Tampa Bay, FL Chapter), Voices of African Mothers, and Zeta Phi Beta sorority.

Past presidents
 Saideh A. Brown
 Iryna Kurowyckyj
 Belle S. Spafford
 Mary Lowe Dickinson
 Eva Perry Moore
 Vera Rivers
 Hope Skillman Schary
 May Wright Sewall
 Mary E. Singletary
 Suzanne Stutman
 Mary Wood Swift
 Frances E. Willard
Merrinelle Rice Sullivan

Gallery

References

Citations

Attribution

External links 

Organizations established in 1888
Women's organizations based in the United States
1888 establishments in the United States